The Formula is the second collaborative studio album by American rapper Buckshot and record producer 9th Wonder. It was released on April 29, 2008 through Duck Down Music. Recording sessions took place at De Stu at North Carolina Central University in Durham, North Carolina. Production was handled entirely by 9th Wonder, with Buckshot and Drew "Dru-Ha" Friedman serving as executive producers. It features guest appearances from Carlitta Durand, Arafat Yates, Big Chops, Keisha Shontelle, Swan, Talib Kweli, Tyler Woods and the Formula Crew. The album debuted at #137 on the Billboard 200 album chart, opening with 5,874 units sold.

A music video for the album's lead single "Go All Out" was directed by Drew "Dru-Ha" Friedman and Rik Cordero and features an appearance from comedian Charlie Murphy. Music videos were also shot for the tracks "Hold It Down" and "The Formula".

Critical reception

The Formula was met with generally favorable reviews. At Metacritic, which assigns a normalized rating out of 100 to reviews from mainstream publications, the album received an average score of 58, based on ten reviews.

Emilee Woods of RapReviews praised the album, saying "minor complaints aside, 9th and Buck have definitely upped the ante on their debut, so much so that a re-naming might be in order". Writing for SPIN, Mosi Reeves stated "despite its title, The Formula has its charms". The A.V. Club reviewer Nathan Rabin said "The Formula should please 9th Wonder and Boot Camp Clik cultists, but hip-hop heads eager to hear 9th Wonder collaborate with rappers worthy of his talents are better off waiting for his next album with Murs--or praying for a reunion with Little Brother". Evan McGarvey of Pitchfork said "...but even with 9th's craftsmanship, the melodies, like Buckshot's lyrics are vacuum-sealed. There's a pianissimo modesty that positively sucks the album dry".

Track listing
All Tracks Produced by Patrick "9th Wonder" Douthit

Personnel
 Kenyatta "Buckshot" Blake – main artist, executive producer
 Patrick "9th Wonder" Douthit – main artist, producer, recording
 Swan – featured artist (track 3)
 Carlitta Durand – featured artist (tracks: 4, 13)
 Talib Kweli – featured artist (track 6)
 Tyler Woods – featured artist (track 6)
 Keisha Shontelle – featured artist (track 7)
 Arafat Yates – featured artist (track 12)
 Big Chops of M1 Platoon – featured artist (track 12)
 Beat Justice – additional vocals (track 1)
 Brittany B – additional vocals (track 1)
 Chi Chi – additional vocals (track 1)
 The World Famous Danny Boy – additional vocals (track 1)
 Ian Schreier – mixing
 Michael Sarsfield – mastering
 Drew "Dru-Ha" Friedman – executive producer
 Skrilla – design, layout
 Robert Adam Mayer – photography
 Noah Friedman – project coordinator, marketing direction

Charts

References

External links

2008 albums
9th Wonder albums
Duck Down Music albums
Buckshot (rapper) albums
Albums produced by 9th Wonder